The Denver Quarterly (known as The University of Denver Quarterly until 1970) is an avant-garde literary journal based at the University of Denver. It was founded in 1966 by novelist John Edward Williams.

Publisher 
The Denver Quarterly is published jointly by the Department of English & Literary Arts at University of Denver. The Denver Quarterly has published poems by many poets, including Dobby Gibson, Seyed Morteza Hamidzadeh, Emily Fragos, Donna L. Emerson, Heather Hughes, L. S. Klatt, and Victoria McArtor.

The Best American Short Stories
Stories from the journal have twice been included in The Best American Short Stories: Margaret Shipley's "The Tea Bowl of Ninsel Nomura," in 1969, and in 1977 Baine Kerr's "Rider."  Victor Kolpacoff's "The Journey to Rutherford" received an Honorable Mention in the 1970 anthology, Walter Benesch received a similar notation for "The Double" in 1971, and John P. Fox got one for "Torchy and My Old Man" (also in 1971).

The Best American Essays
Three essays have had honorable mentions in The Best American Essays: Gabriel Hudson's "The Sky Hermit" in 1986, Stanley Elkin's "What's in a Name? Etc" in 1988, and Albert Goldbarth's "Wind-up Sushi: With Catalogues and Instructions for Assembly" in 1990.

The Best American Poetry
In The Best American Poetry 1990 the poems "First Song/Bankei/1653/" by Stephen Berg, "Climbing Out of the Cage" by Virginia Hooper, and "Distance from Loved Ones" by James Tate. 
In The Best American Poetry 1992 the poems "The Sudden Appearance of a Monster at a Window" by Lawrence Raab and "Lucifer in Starlight" by David St. John.
In The Best American Poetry 1997 the poems "from 'A Summer Evening,' " by Geoffrey Nutter and "Helicopter Wrecked on a Hill" by Christine Hume.
In The Best American Poetry 1998 the poems "Past All Understanding" by Heather McHugh and "A Calm November. Sunday in the Fields," by Sidney Wade. 
In The Best American Poetry 2000 the poem "The Year," by Janet Bowdan.  
In The Best American Poetry 2005 the poem "In the Graveyard of Fallen Monuments," by Rachel Loden.
In The Best American Poetry 2007 the poem "Dear Pearce & Pearce, Inc," by Danielle Pafunda.

Other awards
Stephen Berg, the founder of The American Poetry Review, won the Denver Quarterly a Pushcart Prize for his poem "First Song/Bankei/1653/", which also was included in Best American Poetry 1990.

In 1990, Joanne Greenberg won an O. Henry Award for her short story "Elizabeth Baird," originally published in the Fall 1989 issue of the journal.

Notable contributors

Seth Abramson
Jesse Ball
Owen Barfield

Charles Baxter
Joan Didion
Russell Edson
Raymond Federman

Dana Gioia
Brenda Hillman
Es'kia Mphahlele
Tim O'Brien
Ricardo Pau-Llosa 

Donald Revell
Cole Swensen
John Updike 
Lee Upton

Dara Wier
Yvor Winters
Jim Krusoe

Editors
The first editor was John Edward Williams (1965-1970).  Others have included Jim Clark, Leland Chambers (1977-1983), Donald Revell (1988-1994), Bin Ramke (1994-2011, 2016—2019),  novelist Laird Hunt (2012–2016), and currently W. Scott Howard (2019—present).

Notes and references

http://libinfo.uark.edu/specialcollections/findingaids/williamsje.html
http://www.philsp.com/homeville/anth/s101.htm
https://books.google.com/books?id=1cZZAAAAMAAJ&q=%22denver+quarterly%22+best+american&dq=%22denver+quarterly%22+best+american&lr=&pgis=1
http://www.du.edu/english/binramke.htm
http://www.randomhouse.com/anchor/ohenry/winners/past.html
http://www.bestamericanpoetry.com/archive/?id=19
https://web.archive.org/web/20080725072358/http://www.newpages.com/magazinestand/litmags/reviews_archive_2004/2004_08/default.htm
https://web.archive.org/web/20080928104823/http://eskiaonline.com/content/view/18/33/
http://davidlavery.net/barfield/barfield_resources/Bibliographies/Bibliography.html
http://www.ilab.org/db/detail.php?lang=de&membernr=2318&ordernr=007518
http://www.cmmayo.com/mexico.translators.html
https://books.google.com/books?id=GsdZAAAAMAAJ&q=%22denver+quarterly%22&dq=%22denver+quarterly%22&lr=&pgis=1

External links
 https://web.archive.org/web/20080529180213/http://www.denverquarterly.com/

Poetry magazines published in the United States
Quarterly magazines published in the United States
Magazines established in 1966
Magazines published in Colorado
University of Denver
Mass media in Denver
1966 establishments in Colorado
Avant-garde magazines